Fairbank also known as Fairbanks East, was located on New World Island. It had a population of 112 in 1956.

See also
 List of communities in Newfoundland and Labrador

Populated coastal places in Canada
Populated places in Newfoundland and Labrador